Bohemannia is a genus of moths of the family Nepticulidae.

Species
Bohemannia auriciliella (de Joannis, 1908)
Bohemannia manschurella Puplesis, 1984
Bohemannia nipponicella Hirano, 2010
Bohemannia nubila Puplesis, 1985
Bohemannia piotra Puplesis, 1984
Bohemannia pulverosella (Stainton, 1849)
Bohemannia quadrimaculella (Boheman, 1853)
Bohemannia suiphunella Puplesis, 1984
Bohemannia ussuriella Puplesis, 1984

External links

Fauna Europaea
Bohemannia quadrimaculella images at Consortium for the Barcode of Life
Bohemannia quadrimaculella (Boheman, 1851) images  at UKMoths
Bohemannia pulverosella (Stainton, 1849) images  at UKMoths

Nepticulidae
Monotrysia genera
Taxa named by Henry Tibbats Stainton